The 2008 WAFL season was the 124th season of the various incarnations of the West Australian Football League, and was completely dominated by Subiaco, who not only recorded their first hat-trick of premierships but achieved a dominance over the rest of the league unrivalled in a major Australian Rules league since Port Adelaide in the 1914 SAFL season. The Lions lost once to eventual Grand Final opponents Swan Districts by the narrowest possible margin, and were previously generally predicted to achieve an undefeated season, being rarely threatened in their twenty-one victories. They finished seven-and-a-half games clear of second-placed West Perth, and convincingly won the Grand Final after trailing early.

Subiaco’s dominance overshadowed the other eight clubs, where the most notable features were the fall of 2007 finalists Claremont and East Perth to second last and last respectively, and a comeback by East Fremantle who won only two of their first eleven matches but then won eight of their last nine

Home-and-away season

Round 1

Round 2

Round 3

Round 4

Round 5

Round 6 (Anzac Day)

Round 7

Round 8

Round 9

Round 10

Round 11 (Foundation Day)

Round 12

Round 13

Round 14

Round 15

Round 16

Round 17

Round 18

Round 19

Round 20

Round 21

Round 22

Round 23

Ladder

Finals

Semi-finals

Preliminary final

Grand Final

References

External links
Official WAFL website
West Australian Football League (WAFL) Season 2008

West Australian Football League seasons
WAFL